Francisco Montero Chunga (born 1 March 1952) is a retired Peruvian footballer who is considered an Atlético Torino club idol.

Playing career

Club
He won the Copa Perú four times with Atlético Torino and was also runner-up of the 1980 Torneo Descentralizado. He also played in the 1981 Copa Libertadores.

Managerial career
In 2009, he coached Deportivo Acapulco in the Provincial Stage of the Copa Perú. In 2013, he also coached a U-13 team from Talara's Municipal School who won a tour to Spain and played Real Madrid's U-13 team in a friendly match.

Honours

Club
Atlético Torino 
Torneo Descentralizado: Runner-up 1980
Copa Perú: 1970, 1975, 1977, 1982

Individual
Torneo Descentralizado top scorer: 1984

References

1952 births
Living people
People from Talara
Association football forwards
Peruvian footballers
Peruvian Primera División players
Atlético Chalaco footballers
Atlético Torino footballers
Peruvian football managers